Sridharavarman (Gupta script: , Shri-dha-ra-va-rmma-na, ruled  CE) was a Saka (Indo-Scythian) ruler of Central India, around the areas of Vidisa, Sanchi and Eran in the , just before the Gupta Empire expansion in these areas.

Rule

Sridharavarman is probably the "Saka" ruler mentioned in the Allahabad pillar inscription of Samudragupta, as having "paid homage" to the Gupta Emperor, forced to "self-surrender, offering (their own) daughters in marriage and a request for the administration of their own districts and provinces".

After submitting to Samudragupta, he and his successor may have ruled a bit longer in Eastern Malwa, until they were vanquished by Chandragupta II in his "conquest of the whole world".

Inscriptions

Kanakerha inscription

Sridharavarman is known from two inscriptions: the first one is the Kanakerha inscription at Sanchi.

Eran inscription

Another inscription of the same Sridhavarman, made by his Naga General Satyanaga, was made on a pillar at Eran, only the top portion of which is remaining. The pillar is about 1 foot 6 inches in diameter. The inscription is dated to the 27th year of Sridharavarman's reign. Another famous inscription was later added on the same pillar, the inscription of Goparaja, who died in Eran during the rule of Gupta ruler Bhanugupta, who is also only known from this very inscription.

The Eran inscription of Sridharavarman reads:

At Eran, it seems that this inscription is succeeded chronologically by a monument and an inscription by Gupta Empire's Samudragupta, established "for the sake of augmenting his fame", who may therefore have ousted Sridharavarman in his campaigns to the West.

Connected rulers
While the Western Satrap Rudrasimha II ruled in the western India, the Gupta Emperor Samudragupta may have ousted Sridharavarman during his campaigns in Central India.

Seals with the names of other Saka rulers from Malwa in the 3rd century CE are known.

References

Western Satraps
4th-century Indian monarchs